The Renault E-Tech Series (previously known as Renault Energy F1 and Renault R.E.) is a 1.6-liter, hybrid turbocharged V6 racing engine developed and produced by Renault Sport F1 in partnership with Mecachrome for the FIA Formula One World Championship.

History
Renault Energy F1 was unveiled on 21 June 2013 during 2013 Paris Air Show in order to replace the outgoing Renault RS27 naturally-aspirated V8 engine after seven years of service.

Renault Energy F1-2014
The Renault Energy F1-2014 was Renault's first-ever V6 hybrid turbocharged Formula One engine for the 2014 season. The Renault Energy F1-2014 engine was developed by Renault with technical support from Mecachrome for partial design research & development, trackside support, engine arrangement, preparation, tune-up and engine maintenance. Renault Energy F1-2014 suffered reliability problems during pre-season testing

Applications
Red Bull RB10
Lotus E22
Toro Rosso STR9
Caterham CT05

Renault Energy F1-2015

Applications
Red Bull RB11
Toro Rosso STR10

Renault R.E.16

Applications
Renault R.S.16
Red Bull RB12 (badged as TAG Heuer)

Renault R.E.17

Applications
Renault R.S.17
Red Bull RB13
Toro Rosso STR12

Renault R.E.18

Applications
Renault R.S.18
Red Bull RB14
McLaren MCL33

Renault E-Tech 19

Applications
Renault R.S.19
McLaren MCL34

Renault E-Tech 20

Applications
Renault R.S.20
McLaren MCL35

Renault E-Tech 20B

Applications
Alpine A521

Renault E-Tech R.E.22

Applications
Alpine A522

References

External links
Renault Sport F1's Official Website

E-Tech Series
Formula One engines
Renault engines
Renault